Southworth is an unincorporated community and census-designated place (CDP) on Puget Sound in Kitsap County, Washington, United States. It is best known for being the west end of the Fauntleroy-Vashon Island-Southworth Washington State Ferries run. Landmarks include Southworth Grocery, a US Post Office, ferry terminal, clay cliffs and a private beach on the point. Next to the ferry is a popular place to launch kayaks for trips to nearby Blake Island. The population of the Southworth CDP was 2,185 at the 2010 census.

Geography

Southworth is in southeastern Kitsap County on the shore of Puget Sound, with the CDP limits extending southwest from Point Southworth  along Colvos Passage and northwest from Point Southworth  to Yukon Harbor. The CDP includes the communities of Southworth, Harper, and South Colby. Washington State Route 160 is the southern edge of the CDP and leads west  to State Route 16 in the southern outskirts of Port Orchard.

Point Southworth was named by Charles Wilkes, during the Wilkes Expedition of 1838–1842, in honor of Edward Southworth, one of the expedition's quartermasters.

References

External links
 
Kitsap Peninsula Visitor Information - Southworth

Census-designated places in Kitsap County, Washington
Census-designated places in Washington (state)